The 2nd Caucasian Cavalry Corps (Russian, 2-й Кавказский кавалерийский корпус) was a military formation of the Russian Empire during World War I, from 1 August 1916 to February 1, 1917, and was part of the Russian Caucasian Army.

Commanders
Lieutenant General Fyodor Chernozubov: 1916–1917
Lieutenant General A. A. Pavlov: 1917
Lieutenant General Nikolai Baratov: 1917

Bibliography
 A. K. Zalesskij I mirowaja wojna. Prawitieli i wojennaczalniki. wyd. WECZE Moskwa 2000.

Corps of the Russian Empire